Give Love a Break is an album by Cantopop performer Joey Yung.

Track listing
Personal Forecast
天氣報告 Weather Forecast
16號愛人 Lover No.16
Sandstorm
紅牌出場 Red Penalty Card
Pls Leave a Message
煙霞 Haze
Rainyday on Black Friday
S.O.S
 My Secret Garden
蜃樓 Mirage
Pls Try again later
分身術 Astro Projection
Give Love a Break
男朋友與歌 Boyfriends And Songs
Coming Back
心病 Heart Disease
身驕肉貴 Cherish My Body

Joey Yung albums
2004 albums
Cantonese-language albums